Coppolino is an Italian surname. Notable people with the surname include:

Andrea Coppolino (born 1979), Italian artistic gymnast
Eric Francis Coppolino
Matthew Coppolino (1929–2000), American politician
Nadia Bartel, née Coppolino

Italian-language surnames